Víctor Manuel Durán Zequeida (born January 1, 1996, in Acapulco, Guerrero) is a Mexican professional footballer who currently plays for Yalmakán.

References

1996 births
Living people
Mexican footballers
Association football midfielders
Real Cuautitlán footballers
Potros UAEM footballers
Cruz Azul Hidalgo footballers
Yalmakán F.C. footballers
Ascenso MX players
Liga Premier de México players
Tercera División de México players
Sportspeople from Acapulco
Footballers from Guerrero